Nyctemera obtusa is a moth of the family Erebidae first described by Francis Walker in 1856. It is found on Sulawesi in Indonesia.

References

Nyctemerina
Moths described in 1856